John Thomas Alsop Jr. (August 10, 1874 – May 12, 1958) was an American politician. He served as Mayor of Jacksonville, Florida, from 1923 to 1937, and again from 1941 to 1945. His eighteen-year, seven term stint in the mayor's office is the longest in the city's history. Jacksonville's Main Street Bridge, officially the John T. Alsop Jr. Bridge, is named for him.

References

Keeping the Faith: Race, Politics, and Social Development in Jacksonville, Florida, 1940-1970
St. Petersburg Times - Google News Archive Search

1874 births
1958 deaths
Mayors of Jacksonville, Florida
20th-century American politicians
People from Enfield, North Carolina